Mitchell-Shook House is a historic home located at Greencastle in Franklin County, Pennsylvania. It was built between about 1800 and 1810, and is a two-story, "L"-shaped limestone building. The house is in a vernacular Federal style. It is five bay wide and has a two-story, flat roofed front porch dated to the 1940s.

It was listed on the National Register of Historic Places in 1980.

References 

Houses on the National Register of Historic Places in Pennsylvania
Federal architecture in Pennsylvania
Houses completed in 1810
Houses in Franklin County, Pennsylvania
National Register of Historic Places in Franklin County, Pennsylvania